The Kakanui Range is a range of high hills located inland from Oamaru in the South Island of New Zealand. The range forms a boundary between the valley of the Waitaki River to the north and the high plateau known as the Maniototo and the upper watershed of the Taieri River to the southwest. The highest point in the Kakanui Range is Mount Pisgah, at 1643 m (5394 ft).

The Kakanui Range is crossed by road at Danseys Pass, which has a saddle at 935 m (3070 ft).

The southwestern slopes of the Kakanui Range were a major goldfield during the Central Otago goldrush of the 1860s. Relics from this goldrush can be found at Kyeburn and Naseby.

The Kakanuis continue as the Horse Range to the Pacific at Shag Point.

Mount Pisgah  

References

Mountain ranges of Otago